The 1976 SCCA/USAC Formula 5000 Championship  was the tenth running of the Sports Car Club of America's premier open wheel racing series and the third to be co-sanctioned by the Sports Car Club of America (SCCA) and the United States Auto Club (USAC).

The championship was won by Brian Redman driving a Lola T332 Chevrolet. It was Redman's third consecutive SCCA/USAC Formula 5000 Championship title win. For the first time in three years, a vehicle other than a Lola won a race, with March and Shadow winning one race each. 1976 also marked the first race win by a non-Chevrolet powered car since the 1971 season, with a Dodge-powered Shadow winning at Road America.

1976 was to be the final year of the SCCA/USAC Formula 5000 Championship as the SCCA replaced it with a revived Can Am Series for 1977. The rules for the new series were to allow the Formula 5000 cars to compete with fully enveloping bodywork.

Race results

The championship was contested over a seven race series.

Points system
Championship points were awarded on a 36-24-16-12-8-5-4-3-2-1 basis for the first ten positions in each race.

Final points standings

References

SCCA Continental Championship
Formula 5000
SCCA USAC Formula 5000 Championship